Earl Grant (born December 25, 1976) is an American college basketball coach and the current head coach for the Boston College Eagles men's basketball team. Prior to being named head coach at Boston College, Grant served as head coach at the College of Charleston, as an assistant coach at Clemson University, and an assistant coach for six years under former Charleston assistant coach Gregg Marshall at Wichita State and Winthrop University. Grant also served as an assistant coach at The Citadel.

Biography
A native of North Charleston, South Carolina, Grant went to R.B. Stall High School. He played college basketball at the NCAA Division II level at Georgia College for two years. He led Georgia College to consecutive Peach Belt Conference championships and the Elite Eight of the 2000 NCAA Tournament. Grant graduated from Georgia College in 2000 with a bachelor's degree in psychology. He is married to Jacci Grant and has three sons: Trey, Eyzaiah, and Elonzo.

Grant began his coaching career as an assistant at The Citadel under Pat Dennis from 2002 to 2004. Gregg Marshall hired Grant as an assistant at Winthrop University in 2004, and when Marshall left to take the head coaching gig at Wichita State in 2007, he brought Grant along with him. Grant was hired as an assistant at Clemson in 2010, serving under Brad Brownell. Grant recruited future NBA players K.J. McDaniels and Jaron Blossomgame to Clemson.

On September 2, 2014, Grant was hired as the head coach of the College of Charleston, replacing Doug Wojcik. Dennis, Marshall and Brownell all praised the hire. “We are thrilled to welcome Earl back home and to the College of Charleston,” athletic director Joe Hull said. “He will bring great energy and excitement to our program. He has learned the game from terrific coaches and is ready to lead the Cougars. We need to hit the ground running and Earl is ready to do that.”

Grant led the College of Charleston to the NCAA Tournament in 2018 and was a finalist for the Skip Prosser Man of the year Award in 2019. On March 15, 2021, he was announced as the head coach at Boston College.

Head coaching record

References

External links
 College of Charleston Cougars bio
 Clemson Tigers bio

1976 births
Living people
American men's basketball coaches
American men's basketball players
Basketball coaches from South Carolina
Basketball players from South Carolina
Boston College Eagles men's basketball coaches
Clemson Tigers men's basketball coaches
College men's basketball head coaches in the United States
College men's basketball players in the United States
College of Charleston Cougars men's basketball coaches
Georgia College & State University alumni
Guards (basketball)
People from North Charleston, South Carolina
The Citadel Bulldogs basketball coaches
Wichita State Shockers men's basketball coaches
Winthrop Eagles men's basketball coaches